The following is a list of mountain passes and gaps in the U.S. state of Alabama.

See also

References

External links

Mountain passes